William James Bloye   (8 July 1890 – 6 June 1975) was an English  sculptor, active in Birmingham either side of World War II.

Life

Bloye studied, and later, taught at the Birmingham School of Art (his training was interrupted by World War I, when he served in the Royal Army Medical Corps from 1915 to 1917; he was eventually succeeded at Birmingham by John Bridgeman), where his pupils included Gordon Herickx, Roy Kitchin, Raymond Mason, John Poole and Ian Walters. He also studied stone-carving and letter cutting under Eric Gill around 1921.

In 1925 Bloye became a member of the Birmingham Civic Society, having, at about that time, a studio at 111, Golden Hillock Road, Small Heath, Birmingham. As Birmingham's unofficial civic sculptor he worked on virtually all public commissions including libraries, hospitals and the University. He often carved bas-relief plaques, typically for public houses in Birmingham, and decorated a number of buildings by the architect Holland W. Hobbiss. During the 1920s, he served on the Technical Committee of the Birmingham Civic Society.

Bloye became a member of the Royal British Society of Sculptors: associate (with the honorific suffix ARBS) in 1934, and fellow (FRBS) in 1938. He also won the latter's Otto Beit Medal. Retiring from the School of Art in 1956 he moved to Solihull. He died in Arezzo, Italy in 1975.

In December 2010, a blue plaque was unveiled at City College, on the site of his former studio.

As of January 2010, Birmingham City Council are working on the restoration of Bloye's statue of Pan at Aston Hall. The statue's head is missing, and they have appealed for old photographs to assist in its reconstruction.

RBSA 

Bloye was closely associated with the Royal Birmingham Society of Artists (RBSA). Although the two 1919 bronze plaques at the RBSA entrance are the earliest known work by Bloye in Birmingham, he became a member only in 1930. After a period as vice-president, he became president in 1948 and served in that role until 1950. He was also the RBSA's Professor of Sculpture from at least the mid-1940s until at least 1961 (after which time the post is no longer mentioned in the annual catalogues).

The Society's permanent collection includes one of his works, a life-size plaster bust, Head of Man. It is undated and not usually on display. The subject's name is not recorded.

Selected public works

1919

1920–1929

1930–1940

1950–1959

1960–1974

Date unknown

References

1890 births
1975 deaths
20th-century British sculptors
20th-century English male artists
Artists from Birmingham, West Midlands
British architectural sculptors
English male sculptors
Modern sculptors
People from Small Heath, Birmingham
Members and Associates of the Royal Birmingham Society of Artists
British letter cutters
Fellows of the Royal British Society of Sculptors
Alumni of the Birmingham School of Art
Academics of the Birmingham School of Art
British Army personnel of World War I
Royal Army Medical Corps soldiers